Carsten Baumann (born 28 July 1974) is a German former professional footballer who played as a centre-back.

References

External links
 

Living people
1974 births
Association football central defenders
German footballers
2. Bundesliga players
Regionalliga players
Bayer 04 Leverkusen players
Bayer 04 Leverkusen II players
Bonner SC players
FC Wegberg-Beeck players
Rot Weiss Ahlen players
SG Wattenscheid 09 players
Rot-Weiss Essen players